Bellis caerulescens is a species of daisy in the genus Bellis.

Characteristics
It has pink-ish white petals that appear out from the yellow disk-like floret, much like the species Bellis perennis, however the petals are almost pink with a bit of white at the end where it connects with the disk-like floret.

References

caerulescens